Lindenbach (in its upper course: Talgraben, in its upper course: Lachengraben) is a river of Baden-Württemberg, Germany. It is a right tributary of the Glems in Ditzingen.

See also
List of rivers of Baden-Württemberg

References

Rivers of Baden-Württemberg
Rivers of Germany